Ypsolopha instabilella is a moth of the family Ypsolophidae. It is found in Uzbekistan, Tajikistan, Kyrghyzstan, Asia Minor and in the southern part of eastern Europe.

The larvae feed on Ephedra species, including Ephedra distachya.

References

External links
 Fauna Europaea
 New Records Of Yponomeutoid Moths (Lepidoptera, Yponomeutidae, Plutellidae) From Israel

Ypsolophidae
Moths of Europe
Moths of Asia